Jane the Virgin is an American romantic comedy-drama and satirical telenovela developed by Jennie Snyder Urman. The series premiered October 13, 2014, on The CW and concluded on July 31, 2019. It is a loose adaptation of the Venezuelan telenovela Juana la virgen created by Perla Farías. It stars Gina Rodriguez as Jane Gloriana Villanueva, a devout 23-year-old Latina virgin who becomes pregnant after an accidental artificial insemination by her gynecologist. It parodies common tropes and devices in Latin American telenovelas.

Jane the Virgin received critical acclaim, particularly for its writing and Rodriguez's performance. At the 72nd Golden Globe Awards, Jane the Virgin was nominated for Best Television Series – Musical or Comedy and Gina Rodriguez won Best Actress – Television Series Musical or Comedy. The show received a Peabody Award in 2014 and was also selected as one of the top 10 television programs of 2014 by the American Film Institute.

Beginning with the fourth episode of season three, the series's on-screen title card was modified, with "The Virgin" crossed out in favor of a comedic substitution corresponding to each episode. This mirrored the storyline, in which Jane is no longer a virgin.

Premise
Set in Miami, the series details the surprising and dramatic events that take place in the life of Jane Gloriana Villanueva, a hard-working, religious, young, Venezuelan-American woman with a love for writing and telanovelas. Jane's vow to her grandmother to save her virginity until marriage is made complicated when a doctor mistakenly artificially inseminates her during a checkup. To make matters worse, the biological father, Rafael, is a married man, a former playboy, and a cancer survivor who is both the new owner of the hotel where Jane works and her former teenage crush. Jane's predicament is made more awkward as her mistaken insemination used Rafael's final frozen sample and is the last chance for Rafael to become a father. 

In addition to adjusting to pregnancy and then her motherhood, Jane is faced with many questions about her professional career future and the daunting prospect of choosing between the father of her baby or her detective boyfriend, whom she had been with for two years before the events of the series. As the series evolves, the issues shift as her child grows into a toddler, her writing career moves forward, and her family members likewise develop independent plotlines. Some of these plotlines include issues with immigration status, health concerns, and lessons of self-discovery.

Series overview

Cast

Main

 Gina Rodriguez as Jane Gloriana Villanueva, a 23-year-old, religious Latina virgin who becomes pregnant after being artificially inseminated by mistake. At the time she was dating Michael Cordero, a Miami police officer. She was inseminated with the last sample (that we know of) of a local hotelier, Rafael Solano, a cancer survivor. His wife, Petra, wanted to surprise Rafael with the insemination. Jane learns she is pregnant after she faints on the bus. Michael is not interested in raising another man's child. It turns out that Rafael owns the hotel where Jane is a waitress. After meeting Rafael and hearing his situation, she agrees to carry the baby full term and turn over custody to him and his wife Petra, but only if she is sure her baby will be safe and loved with them. Jane breaks off the engagement with Michael due to him keeping secrets from her regarding the Solanos. As the pregnancy grows, Rafael and Jane start to have feelings for each other, but the relationship doesn't last very long. Jane ends up having a baby boy named Mateo Gloriano Rogelio Solano Villanueva. She marries Michael Cordero in the season two finale. In the tenth episode of season three, she becomes widowed when Michael dies from complications associated with his previous gunshot wound. After trying to find a letter which Michael wrote her while he was alive, her ex-boyfriend Adam comes back into her life, bringing out her fun side, which had been hidden after giving birth. Adam soon leaves for a job offer. She later finds her feelings resurfacing for Rafael again, and after they reunite in Season 4, she marries him at the end of Season 5. Executive producer Jennie Snyder Urman stated that Gina Rodriguez "was literally the third person that came in" during the casting.
Jenna Ortega as Young Jane, at age 10, is the most frequent (21 chapters as of season 3) of the four younger "Janes" seen in flashbacks.
 Andrea Navedo as Xiomara "Xo" Gloriana Villanueva, Jane's outgoing mother. She was only sixteen years old when she had Jane, which is why Jane would rather keep her virginity until marriage than make the same mistake her mother did. She is a dance teacher, but dreams of having a singing career. She marries Jane's father in the Season three finale. In the end of Season 4, she is diagnosed with breast cancer. She survives this, moves with Rogelio to New York for his TV-show, while she enrolls in a nursing school.
 Catherine Toribio plays a younger Xiomara during some flashback sequences.
 Justin Baldoni as Rafael Solano, the 31-year-old owner of the Marbella Hotel and the biological father of Jane's child, who has fallen out of love with his wife. As the series progresses, he develops growing feelings for Jane, and divorces Petra after discovering her affair. In season two, he has two daughters with Petra and, in season three, briefly goes to jail. In season four, he and Jane grow closer and it is thought he would propose. In season five, Jane and Rafael get married.
 Yael Grobglas as Petra Solano (née Anděl, later Dvořáček), born as Natalia, is Rafael's scheming and cheating wife. Rafael later divorces her and in Season 2, she inseminates herself with Rafael's sperm and gives birth to their twin daughters, Anna and Elsa, called Ellie because Petra hates the Frozen references. She later is charged with killing her twin sister, Anezka, but falls in love with her lawyer Jane Ramos (J.R.).
 Ivonne Coll as Alba Gloriana Villanueva, Jane's pious maternal grandmother. She is highly religious, and encourages Jane to save her virginity until marriage. While she is able to speak English, she only speaks Spanish with her family, even when they address her in English. She was in the country illegally until she got her green card in season two. In season 4, she becomes a citizen of United States. She falls in love with her boss Jorge. Jorge proposes to Alba, but she denies it. Soon she realizes that that was a mistake but Jorge had moved on. At the end of Season 4, Alba and Jorge marry to help him meet his mother, who lives out of the country.
 Brett Dier as Michael Cordero Jr. (seasons 1–3, 5; guest season 4), Jane's 29-year-old husband who is a police detective. He is aware of Petra's affair, and blackmails her to ensure that her marriage remains intact, so that Jane will give the baby to them, but he later decides to support Jane's decision to keep the baby. He also dislikes Rafael due to Jane's, and eventually Rafael's, attraction to one another. He is the head detective in the hunt for Sin Rostro, a high-profile drug dealer who seems to be based in the Marbella Hotel; however, he gets shot while searching for Sin Rostro, and he later quits to become a lawyer. Jane and Michael marry in the season two finale. He apparently dies in the tenth episode of season three from an aortic dissection caused by a gunshot. It is revealed in the Season 4 finale that Michael is still alive, however, and the Season 5 premiere explains that Michael's death was staged by Rose. Michael now suffers from amnesia caused by Rose shocking parts of his brain, and now identifies as "Jason" due to severe memory loss. Michael finally gets his memories back but has changed due to being Jason for a few years. Michael and Jane try to discover if there is still anything between them. Unfortunately, too much time has passed, and Michael and Jane part ways. Michael marries his neighbor and they have a baby together.
 Jaime Camil as Rogelio de la Vega, a self-involved, famous telenovela star and Jane's biological father. He is currently trying to gain a relationship with his newly discovered daughter. He also has feelings for Xiomara, who was his girlfriend in high school. He marries Xiomara in the season three finale. He desperately wants a child and has one with Darci Factor. They later have the child and named it Baby Michaelina de la Vega Factor.
 Elias Janssen as Mateo Gloriano Rogelio Solano Villanueva (seasons 4–5), Jane and Rafael's baby. Named after Jane's grandfather and Alba's husband, who died before Jane was born.
 Aria Rose Garcia as toddler Mateo Gloriano Rogelio Solano Villanueva. Joseph Sanders played the role in the third season.
 Anthony Mendez voiced the Latin Lover Narrator, who was revealed, in the series finale, to be adult Mateo (Jane and Rafael's son) as a voiceover actor narrating a telenovela. Though used in Third-person omniscient, the narration featured both metanarration and metafiction.

Recurring
 Yara Martinez as Dr. Luisa Alver, Rafael's lesbian, neurotic, recovering alcoholic older sister, and the doctor who accidentally artificially inseminated Jane. She later has a relationship with her step mother, Sin Rostro/Rose.
 Bridget Regan as Rose, a former lawyer, former girlfriend of Luisa, and eventually stepmother of Luisa and Rafael who defends Luisa against the malpractice suit. She is later revealed to be the crime lord Sin Rostro, and is arrested in season three but dies in season 5.
Megan Ketch as Susanna Barnett (season 2), Michael's partner who was in fact Rose in disguise. After being discovered, she shot Michael in the chest. Before this she has a relationship with Luisa, but Luisa was unaware that she was actually Rose.
 Elisabeth Röhm as Eileen (season 3), the second woman whose identity Rose steals for the next three years. In the meantime, the real Eileen murdered Scott.
 Mia and Ella Allan as Anna and Ellie Solano (seasons 3–5), Petra and Rafael's twin daughters as a result of Petra's artificial insemination.
 Carlo Rota as Emilio Solano (season 1), Luisa's biological father and Rafael's adopted father. He is murdered by his wife, Rose.
 Michael Rady as Lachlan Moore (seasons 1–2), Rafael's rival and Petra's former fiancé.
 Diane Guerrero as Lina Santillan, Jane's life-long best friend and co-worker.
 Carmen Carrera as Eva, Jane's co-worker (season 1).
 Azie Tesfai as Detective Nadine Hansan (seasons 1–2), a police detective and rival, partner, and brief lover to Michael. She was killed taking a bullet that was meant for Michael, after she was revealed to be working with Sin Rostro.
 Priscilla Barnes as Magda Anděl, Petra's mother. She uses a wheelchair (but only pretends to be paraplegic) and she is Petra's co-conspirator in her plot to steal Rafael's hotel and wealth. While imprisoned, she was still working against Petra from inside; she is now out.
 Yael Grobglas also portrays Anežka (seasons 2–4), Petra's long-lost twin sister who grew up with a rough life in the Czech Republic. At the end of the second season she drugs Petra and begins a scheme with Magda to impersonate Petra so they can gain controlling shares in the Marbella. She is then murdered by her sister, Petra.
 Adam Rodriguez as Jonathan Chavez (seasons 2, 4) Jane's teacher at grad school and a brief love interest. Later found out that he is known for affairs with students.
 Alano Miller as Roman Zazo (season 1), Rafael's best friend and Petra's lover. He is believed to be murdered in the hotel, causing tension for everyone, including Petra and Rafael.
 Miller also portrays Aaron Zazo (season 1), Roman's twin brother, who appears from "Chapter Fourteen" onwards investigating his brother's murder, is later revealed to be Roman; it was Aaron who was murdered. Roman is later killed, in self-defense, by Petra.
 Shelly Bhalla as Krishna (seasons 2–5), Petra's assistant, formerly Rafael's assistant. She is believed to be blackmailing Petra in season 4, but it turns out that she was the one being blackmailed.
Ricardo Chavira as Bruce (season 3), Xiomara's boyfriend of three years who she becomes briefly engaged to, only to break things off due to her lingering feelings for Rogelio.
Justina Machado as Darci Factor (seasons 3–5), Rogelio's ex-girlfriend and the mother of her and Rogelio's daughter "Baby Michaelina de la Vega Factor". She runs a matchmaking business.
Alfonso DiLuca as Jorge (seasons 3–5), Alba's love interest, co-worker and later boyfriend who eventually becomes her husband.
Johnny Messner as Chuck Chesser (seasons 3–4), the new owner of the rival hotel to the Marbella who serves as a new love interest for Petra.
Francisco San Martin as Fabian (seasons 3–4), Rogelio's costar on telenovela Los Viajes de Guillermo who has a brief fling with Jane.
Tyler Posey as Adam Alvaro (seasons 3–4), Jane's first love and later boyfriend, who is bisexual.
Rosario Dawson as Jane Ramos (seasons 4–5), Petra's attorney and love interest who broke up with her to pursue a job in Texas, but they later reunite in season 5.

Production

On June 27, 2013, The CW announced that it was planning to release a new show based on the Venezuelan telenovela Juana La Virgen. On February 23, 2014, Entertainment Weekly announced that Rodriguez would play the title role of Jane Villanueva. On May 8, 2014, during The CW's 2014–2015 upfronts, the series was officially picked up. and on July 18, 2014, an extended trailer was released by The CW. On August 8, 2014, it was announced that White Collars Bridget Regan and Azie Tesfai would join the series as respectively Rose, a former lawyer, and Detective Nadine Hansan, a police detective and rival to Dier's character. On August 10, 2014, TVLine announced that Melrose Place and Emily Owens, M.D. actor Michael Rady would join the series as Lachlan. Filming for season one commenced on July 28, 2014. The show is filmed on soundstages in Los Angeles and the pilot was filmed in Huntington Beach, California. On October 21, 2014, the show was given a full season order. On January 11, 2015, the show was renewed for a second season, set to air during the 2015–16 television season. Its second season premiered on October 12, 2015. On March 11, 2016, the show was renewed for a third season, which premiered on October 17, 2016. On January 8, 2017, The CW renewed the series for a fourth season that premiered on October 13, 2017. On April 2, 2018, The CW renewed the series for a fifth and final season, which premiered on March 27, 2019.

Broadcast
Jane the Virgin premiered on The CW on October 13, 2014, during the 2014–15 television season. Unique to the CW, it is the network's only program to feature a Spanish language audio track on the second audio program channel; however, as many CW stations usually do not carry the SAP channel due to a lack of need, this is more limited than the major networks, which are required by the FCC to have a SAP channel for the Descriptive Video Service track, which as a minor network the CW is not required to carry.

Home media
Warner Home Video originally released Season 1 on DVD, but poor sales caused a switch in distribution rights with CBS (distributed by Paramount Home Entertainment) now releasing every season of Jane the Virgin as manufacture-on-demand Blu-ray and DVDs exclusively on Amazon going forward in addition to a manufacture-on-demand reissue of Season 1.

Reception

Critical response
The first season of Jane the Virgin received critical acclaim, Review aggregator website Rotten Tomatoes gives the first season of the show a "certified fresh" rating of 100% based on 51 reviews, with a rating average of 7.7 out of 10. The site's consensus states, "Jane the Virgin dubious premise has become part of its unlikely charm – along with delightfully diverse writing and a knockout performance by Gina Rodriguez." Metacritic, another review aggregator, gives the show a score of 80 out of 100, based on 23 reviews, indicating "generally favorable reviews".

The second season also received critical acclaim, on Metacritic, the season holds an 87 out of 100, based on four reviews, indicating "universal acclaim". Rotten Tomatoes gave it a rating of 100% based on 12 reviews and a rating average of 9.7 out of 10. The site's consensus reads, "Jane the Virgin stays true to its over-the-top telenovela roots in season two while layering in more humor and increasingly complex storytelling." Maureen Ryan of Variety praised the show, saying that the series "is envisioned, edited and curated with great deftness and economy, and the fact that it is so entertaining and accessible should not preclude it from being at the center of conversations about the best the medium has to offer."

Critics' top ten lists

Ratings

Accolades
The show has been acknowledged by the People's Choice Awards, Golden Globe Awards, Critics' Choice Awards, the Primetime Emmy Awards, the Image Awards and the Television Critics Association as well as honored by the American Film Institute and the George Foster Peabody Awards.

Novel
A tie-in novel, based on the book Jane writes in the show, has been published. The story is a historical romance set in Miami during 1902. In the series, the book's plot is inspired by the love story of Jane and Michael.

International adaptations
The international rights are distributed by Propagate Content.

Cancelled spin-off
On December 3, 2018, it was announced that The CW was developing a possible spin-off of the series to launch in the 2019–20 television series. The potential series was conceived and written by Jane the Virgin writer and co-executive producer Valentina Garza as "a soapy, telenovela-inspired anthology series in the tradition of [its parent series] where each season was based on a different fictional novel [written by] Jane and narrated by Gina Rodriguez, who would reprise her role in the spin-off. On January 23, 2019, the spin-off, titled Jane the Novela, was ordered to pilot at The CW. In February 2019, it was announced that Jacqueline Grace Lopez was cast as the main character, Estela. On March 7, 2019, it was announced that Marcia Cross was cast as Renata. On March 15, 2019 Hunter Parrish was cast as Felix, one of two male leads. Remy Hii was cast as the second male lead Luen on March 19, 2019.

On May 7, 2019, it was announced that the spin-off would not be moving forward.

Remake
A Korean remake of the series titled as Woori the Virgin starring Im Soo-hyang in titular role was released on May 9, 2022 aired by Seoul Broadcasting System.

References

External links
 
 
 

2010s American LGBT-related comedy television series
2010s American comedy-drama television series
2010s American romantic comedy television series
2010s American satirical television series
2014 American television series debuts
2019 American television series endings
American LGBT-related sitcoms
Comedy telenovelas
Hispanic and Latino American television
Latino sitcoms
Lesbian-related television shows
Peabody Award-winning television programs
Pregnancy-themed television shows
Television series about families
Television series by CBS Studios
Television series by Warner Bros. Television Studios
Television shows set in Miami
Television series set in hotels
The CW original programming
Virginity in television